BET Style is an entertainment show, much like syndicated Entertainment Tonight, that focuses on African Americans in the entertainment industry. It aired from 2004 to 2006 on Black Entertainment Television at 7:30e-p/6:30c on Thursdays. Its hosts were usually Big Tigger and Melyssa Ford. Its last episode was on July 6, 2006.  It was replaced by The Black Carpet, a show covering similar material in a new style.

References

2004 American television series debuts
Style
Entertainment news shows in the United States
2006 American television series endings